The 2018–19 Valparaiso Crusaders women's basketball team represents Valparaiso University during the 2018–19 NCAA Division I women's basketball season. The Crusaders, led by first-year head coach Mary Evans, play their home games at the Athletics–Recreation Center as members of the Missouri Valley Conference. They seek to finish their first NCAA Tournament since 2004.

Roster

Schedule and results

|-
!colspan=9 style=| Exhibition

|-
!colspan=9 style=| Non-conference regular season

|-
!colspan=9 style=| MVC regular season

|-
!colspan=9 style=| MVC Tournament

Source

See also
2018–19 Valparaiso Crusaders men's basketball team

References

Valparaiso
Valparaiso Beacons women's basketball seasons
Valparaiso Crusaders women's basketball
Valparaiso Crusaders women's basketball